Penicillium sublectaticum is a species of fungus in the genus Penicillium which was isolated from house dust in Dunedin in New Zealand.

References 

sublectaticum
Fungi described in 2014